Rosanna Conte (born 17 April 1968 in Portogruaro) is an Italian politician who was elected as a member of the European Parliament in 2019.

References

1968 births
Living people
MEPs for Italy 2019–2024
21st-century women MEPs for Italy
Lega Nord MEPs